A Chinese independent high school is a type of private high school in Malaysia. They provide secondary education in the Chinese language as the continuation of the primary education in Chinese national-type primary schools. The main medium of instruction in these schools is Mandarin Chinese using simplified Chinese characters.

The United Chinese School Committees Association of Malaysia (UCSCAM, the association of Chinese school trustees), also known as the Dong Zong, coordinates the curriculum used in the schools and organises the Unified Examination Certificate (UEC) standardised test. Despite this, the schools are independent of each other and are free to manage their own affairs.

Chinese independent high schools represent a small number of high schools in Malaysia. The number of Chinese independent high schools differed among sources, ranging from 60 to 63, due to the ambiguous status of SM Chong Hwa Kuantan and whether branch campuses count as separate schools. In 2020, UCSCAM adopted the "60+2+1" formula in describing the number of Chinese independent high schools:
60 Chinese independent high schools originated from the aftermath of school conversions in the 1960s
2 branch campuses of Foon Yew High School (Kulai branch and Bandar Seri Alam branch)
1 private school allowed to participate in the UEC examinations (SM Chong Hwa Kuantan)

Being private schools, Chinese independent high schools do not receive consistent funding from the Malaysian government, although they did receive some funding from some state governments as well as in the 2019 and 2020 budgets under the Pakatan Harapan government. However, in accordance with their aim of providing affordable education to all in the Chinese language, their school fees are substantially lower than those of most other private schools. The schools are kept alive almost exclusively by donations from the public.

History
Chinese schools were being founded by the ethnic Chinese in Malaya as early as the 19th century. The schools were set up with the main intention of providing education in the Chinese language. As such, their students remain largely Chinese to this day even though the school themselves are open to people of all races and backgrounds.

After Malaya's independence in 1957, the government instructed all schools to surrender their properties and be assimilated into the National School system. This caused an uproar among the Chinese and a compromise was achieved in that the schools would instead become "National Type" schools. Under such a system, the government is only in charge of the school curriculum and teaching personnel while the lands still belonged to the schools. While Chinese primary schools were allowed to retain Chinese as the medium of instruction, Chinese secondary schools are required to change into English-medium schools. Over 60 schools converted to become National Type schools, including famous schools like Chung Ling High School, Penang Chinese Girls' High School on Penang Island, Jit Sin High School, and Ave Maria Convent High School, Sam Tet High School. While the medium language for most subjects is switched to English as according to the proposal, the teaching and learning of Mandarin remained compulsory in these schools, with most of them dedicating at least one seventh to one fifth of their teaching time per week to Mandarin studies.

This plan was still viewed as an unacceptable compromise amongst some Chinese, and a minority of the Chinese schools refused the proposal and became private high schools or Chinese independent high schools as they were later called. This concept slowly gained popularity and, during the 1960s and 70s, many of the National Type high schools reopened their independent high school branch. Their numbers continued to grow until a period when the political situation in Malaysia made it impossible to set up additional independent Chinese high schools. Currently there are 60 independent Chinese high schools in Malaysia, including Foon Yew High School, which is the largest secondary school in the country with over 10,000 students. Foon Yew High School was the first school to refuse the government's proposal, as well as the first high school to have two branch campuses (located in Kulai and Bandar Seri Alam). The second largest is Chong Hwa Independent High School, Kuala Lumpur, which is known for its excellent academic performance as well as award-winning performance in inter-school competitions.

Chinese independent high schools in East Malaysia
There are 23 Chinese independent high schools in East Malaysia.

In 1960, there were 18 high schools using Chinese as the medium of teaching and 22 high schools teaching in the English medium in Sarawak alone. In the year, the British Crown Colony who were then in control of Sarawak proposed that the 18 high schools using Chinese as the medium of teaching be converted into using English. In 1961, a letter was sent to all of the Chinese-medium high schools demanding them to convert teaching of all subjects into English before 1 April 1962. Failing to do so, the schools would not be given any allocations from the government. Despite strong rejection by the local Chinese community, the plan still took place.

In the end, six high schools out of the 18 refused to convert to teaching in English; they were the Chung Hua Middle School No.1, Chung Hua Middle School No.3, Chung Hua Middle School No.4, Guong Ming Middle School, Kiang Hin Middle School and Kai Dee Middle School. The rest of the school which converted into English medium schools ended up as "Sekolah Kebangsaan" after Sarawak joined Malaysia. In 1983 these English medium schools were once again converted into using Bahasa Malaysia as the medium of teaching.

The Chinese community not only continued to support the six high schools which retained the teaching in Chinese (founded in between 1945 and 1960), they had even founded another eight high schools between 1962 and 1968. These 14 high schools then became a part of Malaysia's Chinese independent high school and still exist today.

In Sabah, all of the nine Chinese independent high schools in the state were formed in between 1960 and 1969.

Characteristics
Students usually spend six years in a Chinese Independent High School. The six years are divided into two stages: three years in junior middle and three years in senior middle, similar to the secondary school systems in mainland China and Taiwan. Students are streamed into tracks like Science or Art/Commerce in the senior middle stage. At the end of each stage, students sit for the Unified Examination Certificate (UEC). A few schools offer an additional year in senior middle, catering to students taking the government's Sijil Tinggi Pelajaran Malaysia (STPM, equivalent to A-level).

Chinese independent high schools use the same academic year as government schools. An academic year consists of two semesters: Semester 1 from January to May and Semester 2 from June to November, with examinations at the end of each semester. The overall academic performance of a student in an academic year determines his/her promotion to the next study year in the next academic year. Failing requires repeating the study year. Usually, failing to be promoted for two years in a row results in a dismissal. In contrast, students in government schools are automatically promoted regardless of academic performance.

The curriculum used in Chinese independent high schools is developed and coordinated by the Curriculum Department of UCSCAM with reference to secondary education curricula around the world, particularly Malaysia's national secondary education curriculum and those of mainland China as well as Taiwan. UCSCAM publishes textbooks for use in Chinese independent high schools.

Unified Examination Certificate (UEC)

The Unified Examination Certificate (UEC) ( is a standardised test for Chinese independent high school students organised by the UCSCAM since 1975. The UEC is available in three levels: Junior Middle (UEC-JML), Vocational (UEC-V), and Senior Middle (UEC-SML). Examinations for non-language subjects in the UEC-JML (except in Sabah) and UEC-V are in Chinese. In Sabah, UEC-JML science and mathematics are available in Chinese and English. The UEC-SML has examinations for mathematics, sciences (biology, chemistry and physics), book keeping, accounting, and commerce available in Chinese and English, while other non-language subjects are only available in Chinese.

The UEC-SML is recognised as a qualification for entrance into many tertiary educational institutions around the world, including the United Kingdom, the United States, Taiwan, Hong Kong, China, Japan, Singapore, Australia, Canada and many others. It is not recognised by the government of Malaysia for entry into public universities, but most private colleges recognise it.

As the UEC is not recognised by the Malaysian government, some Chinese independent high schools opt to teach the national secondary school curriculum (in Malay) alongside the independent school curriculum (in Chinese) and require students to sit for the government standardised tests (PT3, SPM or even STPM) as private school candidates, providing the students an opportunity to obtain government-recognised certificates.

Chinese educationalist Dr Kua Kia Soong mentions the introduction of the UEC in his book Protean Saga: The Chinese Schools of Malaysia.  According to the book, the introduction of the UEC led to Dr Mahathir Mohamad, the then Minister of Education and later the Prime Minister of Malaysia, summoning the Chinese educationalists to parliament. To quote the book, "The latter (Mahathir) did not mince his words but told the Dong Jiao Zong leaders that UEC had better not be held or else ... He did not ask for any response and dismissed the Chinese educationalists with a curt ... 'that is all'."

In May 2004 the National Accreditation Board (LAN) required students entering local private colleges using any qualification other than the SPM to pass the SPM Malay paper. This drew protests and caused the then Minister of Higher Education Dr Shafie Salleh exempted UEC students from this requirement.

Medium of instruction
The main medium of instruction in Chinese independent high schools for non-language subjects is Mandarin Chinese using simplified Chinese characters. In some schools, certain subjects at the senior middle levels (the sciences, mathematics, bookkeeping, accounting and commerce) are taught using English teaching materials and exam papers for those subjects are set in English, but teachers may instruct and explain in Mandarin. For schools that prepare students to take national exams (PT3, SPM and STPM) alongside the UEC, Bahasa Malaysia teaching materials in conjunction with the national curriculum are used in preparatory classes for those exams.

See also
 Education in Malaysia

References

External links
 United Chinese School Committees Association of Malaysia (UCSCAM), known as Dong Jiao Zong (Chinese:董教总)

 
Education in Malaysia
Minority schools
Private schools in Malaysia